The London and North Western Railway (LNWR) Greater Britain class was a class of ten 2-2-2-2 steam locomotives designed for express passenger work by F. W. Webb.

History
The first of the ten locomotives was built in October 1891, and a second followed in May 1893; the remaining eight came from Crewe Works in April and May 1894.

They were three-cylinder compound locomotives: the two outside high pressure cylinders drove the trailing drivers via Howe-Stephenson valve gear, the one inside low pressure cylinder drive the leading drivers via a slip eccentric. There was no connection between the two sets of drivers.

All the locomotives were named; one unusual feature (shared with the John Hick class) was that the names were split over two nameplates, one on each driving wheel splasher. This necessitated the use of two-word names, rather than some of the abbreviated names the LNWR had previously used.

They continued in service until Webb's retirement. His successor, George Whale preferred simple superheated locomotives; consequently they were all scrapped between 1906 and 1907.

Fleet list

References

External links
 LNWR Society Photographs of the Webb 2-2-2-2 Greater Britain class steam locomotives.

Greater Britain
2-2-2-2 locomotives
Duplex locomotives
Railway locomotives introduced in 1892
Standard gauge steam locomotives of Great Britain